Gash (also Romanized as Gāsh; also known as Gās and Qāsh or Gush) is a village in Baq Mej Rural District, in the Central District of Chenaran County, Razavi Khorasan Province, Iran. At the 2006 census, its population was 418, in 99 families.

References 

Populated places in Chenaran County